Bou Saâda District is a district of M'Sila Province, Algeria.

Municipalities
The district is further divided into 3 municipalities:
Bou Saâda
El Hamel
Oultene

Zawiya

 Zawiyet El Hamel

The creation of the Zaouïa complex dates back to the 19th century, founded by  born in 1823 in the vicinity of Hassi Bahbah in the Djelfa Province. After he died in 1897, his daughter Lalla Zaynab succeeded him until 1904.

The zaouïa consists of a mosque, a Koranic school, and the mausoleum where the founder and his successors rest.

District of M'Sila Province